Engebret Olsen Moe (22 July 1780 – 9 May 1849) was a Norwegian Member of parliament.

Engebret Olsen Moe was born at Vaker in Norderhov, now Ringerike, Norway. He was a farmer at  Mo Gård in Hole, Buskerud, Norway. He served as mayor of the municipality of Hole  from 1848 to 1849 and was a member of the  Parliament of Norway. He was elected to  Parliament in 1815, representing the rural constituency of Buskeruds Amt.  He was re-elected in 1830, 1833 and 1839.

Moe was married in 1805 to  Marthe Jørgensdatter Moe (1786–1846), with whom he had eight children. Their children included  Jørgen Moe, noted folklorist, poet, author and Bishop in the Church of Norway. Their grandchildren included Moltke Moe who was a professor at the University of Christiania.

References

External links
Mo Gård

1780 births
1849 deaths
People from Hole, Norway
Norwegian farmers
Members of the Storting
Mayors of places in Buskerud